Lindfield railway station is located on the North Shore line, serving the Sydney suburb of Lindfield. It is served by Sydney Trains T1 North Shore line services.

History

Lindfield station opened on 1 January 1890 when the North Shore line opened from Hornsby to St Leonards.

By 1900, the line south of Lindfield had been duplicated with the platform converted to an island platform, this was extended north in 1909. By 1922, a new side platform had been opened on the eastern side, with the middle platform becoming a terminating road.

The station was upgraded with a new concourse and lifts constructed in 2009.

Services

Lindfield Station is served by three bus routes operated by Transdev NSW and one NightRide route.

Trackplan

References

External links

 Lindfield Station details Transport for New South Wales  (Archived 20 June 2019)

Easy Access railway stations in Sydney
Railway stations in Sydney
Railway stations in Australia opened in 1890
Lindfield, New South Wales
North Shore railway line